Magical is the adjective for magic. It may also refer to:

 Magical (horse) (foaled 2015), Irish Thoroughbred racehorse
 "Magical" (song), released in 1985 by John Parr
 Magical: Disney's New Nighttime Spectacular of Magical Celebrations, a 2009–2014 summer fireworks show at Disneyland
 Magical Company, a Japanese entertainment company